mail is a command-line email client for Unix and Unix-like operating systems.

History
"Electronic mail was there from the start", Douglas McIlroy writes in his article "A Research UNIX Reader: Annotated Excerpts from the Programmer’s Manual, 1971-1986", and so a  command was included in the first released version of research Unix, First Edition Unix.
This version of mail was capable to send (append) messages to the mailboxes of other users on the Unix system, and it helped managing (reading) the mailbox of the current user.

In 1978 Kurt Shoens wrote a completely new version of mail for BSD2, referred to as Berkeley Mail.

See also
Cleancode email
mailx

References

External links
 at GNU Mailutils manual
S-nail manual

Unix Internet software